In mathematical physics, the Peres metric is defined by the proper time

for any arbitrary function f.  If f is a harmonic function with respect to x and y, then the corresponding Peres metric satisfies the Einstein field equations in vacuum.  Such a metric is often studied in the context of gravitational waves.  The metric is named for Israeli physicist Asher Peres, who first defined the metric in 1959.

See also

Introduction to the mathematics of general relativity
Stress–energy tensor
Metric tensor (general relativity)

References
 

Metric tensors
Spacetime
Coordinate charts in general relativity
General relativity
Gravity